The Women's singles competition at the 2017 World Championships was held on 28 January 2017.

Results
The first run as started at 10:03 and the second run at 11:52.

References

Women's singles